Urocordylus is an extinct genus of nectridean lepospondyl. It is the type genus of the family Urocordylidae. Fossils have been found from Ireland that date back to the Westphalian stage of the late Carboniferous.

See also
 Prehistoric amphibian
 List of prehistoric amphibians

References

Carboniferous amphibians
Holospondyls
Fossils of Ireland